Mika Johansson (born 13 March 1984) is a Finnish footballer who currently plays for FC Honka in Finnish Kakkonen.

References
 Guardian Football

Finnish footballers
FC Jokerit players
Myllykosken Pallo −47 players
Helsingin Jalkapalloklubi players
Living people
1984 births
HIFK Fotboll players
Association football goalkeepers